Rupauli Assembly constituency is an assembly constituency in Purnia district in the Indian state of Bihar.

Overview
As per Delimitation of Parliamentary and Assembly constituencies Order, 2008, No 60. Rupauli Assembly constituency is composed of the following: Rupauli and Bhawanipur community development blocks; Aurlaha, Bhatsara, Laxmipur, Nathpur, Patraha, Arbanna Chakla, Thari and Basudeopur of Barhara Kothi CD Block.

Rupauli Assembly constituency is part of No 12 Purnia (Lok Sabha constituency).

Members of Legislative Assembly

Election Results

2020

1957-2010 
In the 2010 state assembly elections,  Bima Bharti of JD(U) won the Rupauli assembly seat defeating her nearest rival Shankar Singh of LJP. Contests in most years were multi cornered but only winners and runners up are being mentioned. Bima Bharti representing RJD defeated Shanakar Singh of LJP in October 2005. Shankar Singh of LJP defeated Bima Bharti of RJD in February 2005. Bima Bharti, contesting as an Independent candidate defeated Md. Alimuddin of SP in 2000. Bal Kishor Mandal of CPI defeated Ram Chandra Das of SP in 1995. Saryug Mandal, Independent, defeated Jai Krishna Singh of BJP in 1990. Dinesh Kumar Singh of Congress defeated Saryug Mandal of CPI in 1985 and 1980. Shaligram Singh Tomar of JP defeated Saryug Mandal of CPI in 1977.

References

External links
 

Assembly constituencies of Bihar
Politics of Purnia district